Timothy Ashley Worley (born September 24, 1966) is a former American football running back who played for the Georgia Bulldogs in college, and the Pittsburgh Steelers and Chicago Bears of the National Football League (NFL).

Early years
Worley was born in Lumberton, North Carolina.  He attended Lumberton High School, and was recognized as a Parade magazine high school football All-American. Tim was also a high school track star as a sprinter. As a senior, he won the state titles in both the 100m & 200m dash. His personal best in the 100m dash was 10.3 and his personal best in the 200m dash was 20.85

College career
Worley began his collegiate career at the University of Georgia in 1985. He was the team's second leading rusher as a freshman with 627 yards and led the team in touchdowns with 10. That same year, he scored an 89-yard touchdown against No. 1 ranked Florida, finishing with 125 yards rushing and leading Georgia to a 24–3 upset. Worley's 1985 team was the first—and only—UGA football team to defeat the #1 ranked team in the country until 2022 when the Bulldogs defeated the No. 1 Tennessee Volunteers.

Worley's sophomore season ended early due to a torn anterior cruciate ligament.  The injury was so severe that he needed almost two years of rehab, forcing him to sit out all of the 1987 season.  He also became academically ineligible during that time, and worked hard at a junior college (while rehabbing his knee) to restore his grade point average, and his NCAA eligibility.

In 1988, Worley re-emerged with his focus balanced on both the books and the football field. He led Georgia in rushing with 1,216 yards, which ranks seventh among Georgia running backs for a single season. He was named first-team All-American by Kodak, the Walter Camp Football Foundation, and the Football Writers Association of America. United Press International named him its SEC Offensive Player of the Year. He finished his career at Georgia with 2,038 yards, 27 touchdowns and 5.8 yards per carry (fifth all-time at Georgia). Tim only played two full seasons, plus four games during his time at the University of Georgia.

He was selected in the first round (7th overall) of the 1989 NFL Draft by the Steelers.

Statistics

NFL career
Worley showed promise in his rookie season, amassing 770 yards rushing and five touchdowns on 195 carries.  His production fell off his second season, however, as he earned only 418 yards and no touchdowns.  He was injured for most of the 1991 NFL season and was suspended the following year from the NFL due to missing two mandatory drug tests.  He also had a problem holding onto the ball; he had 16 fumbles during his three-plus years in Pittsburgh.

The Steelers traded Worley to the Bears in 1993 for a fifth-round draft pick.  The trade, intended to enhance the Bears' rushing attack with Neal Anderson and to resurrect Worley's career.  After appearing in only five games during the 1994 NFL season, the Bears released him, and Worley chose to retire from the NFL.

Statistics

Post NFL

On October 23, 2007, Worley was inducted into the Georgia-Florida Hall of Fame, which recognizes the careers and outstanding performances that have occurred during the decades-long rivalry.

Worley's troubles with the law resurfaced on April 13, 2008, as he was arrested for speeding and failure to maintain the lane in Smyrna, Georgia. It is commonly believed that Worley was arrested for driving under the influence, however he was never charged with that offense nor with a DUI.  Officers used a Taser to subdue Worley after an altercation with the arresting officer. Police held Worley in custody on outstanding warrants from Arcade in Jackson County and Social Circle in Walton County.  Worley now credits that police officer with "saving his life," and refers to the incident as the defining moment prompting his re-commitment to his faith and fueling his entrepreneurial spirit.

Worley was also inducted into the Robeson County Hall of Fame in 2011.

In 2013, Worley was selected as the University of Georgia's "SEC Legend." Based on stringent criteria outlined by the Southeastern Conference, Worley was chosen by the most senior administrative officers at the University of Georgia, with the athletic director, Greg McGarity, having the final say in the decision. He was honored on the field during the 2013 SEC Championship game in Atlanta.

Today, Worley is a John C. Maxwell-certified Speaker and Life Skills Consultant, and a certified Human Behavior Consultant (DISC Personality Assessment). He is contracted with K-LOVE / AiR1 Radio as a speaker for its national "Dare to Dream" school assembly program. Worley travels the country speaking to thousands in the amateur sports, professional sports, corporate, leadership, ministry and youth sports league sectors. His is currently penning his memoir, which is slated for publishing in 2017.

Personal and Professional life
Worley co-founded a communications consulting firm—Worley Global Enterprises—with his wife, Dee (Foster) Worley. Tim leads the Motivational Speaking division, with a strong focus on Life Skills Consulting, and his wife Dee leads the Marketing Communications Consulting division. Dee was a highly decorated, Olympic-caliber, youth gymnast, recruited heavily by Georgia and Alabama, among others. She ultimately settled on Tuscaloosa to continue her gymnastics career. Dee had one of the greatest collegiate careers of any SEC athlete. She was a 17-time All-American, a four-time champion and a nine-time regional champion. As a senior in 1993, she set an NCAA record with perfect 10’s in five consecutive meets.

His first marriage was to Rebecca Masse (Now Rebecca Masse Arnold). They have two children: Brandon Timothy Worley (3.11.92) and Taylor Nicole Worley (9.26.94).

References

External links
 WorleyGlobalEnterprises.com

 More on Tim Worley at www.bearshistory.com

1966 births
Living people
All-American college football players
American football running backs
Georgia Bulldogs football players
People from Lumberton, North Carolina
Players of American football from North Carolina
Pittsburgh Steelers players
Chicago Bears players